Paula Ivan (born 20 July 1963 as Ionescu, later known as Ilie) is a retired Romanian middle-distance runner.

Born in Herăști, Giurgiu County, she graduated from the Gheorghe Șincai High School in Bucharest in 1982. In 1987, Ivan won gold medals in the 1500 m and 3000 m at the 1987 Summer Universiade. Later the same year at the World Championships she did not advance past the heats of the same events. In July 1988 she won the 800 m and 1500 m events at the Balkan Games, setting her all-times personal best over 800 m. On 27 July at Verona Ivan broke the 4-minute barrier over 1500 m, clocking 3:58.80. She improved to 3:56.22 in Zurich on 17 August. At the 1988 Summer Olympics she won a silver medal in her first event, 3000 m, followed by a gold in the 1500 m. Her winning time, 3:53.96 was the Olympic record until 2021.

In 1989 Ivan won the 1500 m at the European Indoor Championships in Den Haag, in a time of 4:07.16. Later that year, outdoors, she broke the world record for the mile with a time of 4:15.61. She repeated her 1500/3000 m golden double at the Universiade in Duisburg in August and then won the 1500 m at the IAAF World Cup in Barcelona in September. She then retired from competitions to become a coach.

Ivan competed in the IAAF World Cross Country Championships four times (1984–1987). At the 1985 championships, she was part of the Romanian team that won the bronze medal (Ivan finished 34th). Her best individual performance was a 9th-place finish at the 1987 race in Warsaw.

In 2000, at 36 years old and after ten seasons away from competition, Ivan returned for one more season. She ran the 1500 m in several meets on the IAAF Grand Prix circuit, with her season's best time being 4:04.66, at the Monte Carlo Herculis-Zepter meet, on 18 August 2000. Since 2002, she works at the Faculty of Physical Education and Sport at Spiru Haret University in Bucharest.

References

1963 births
Living people
People from Giurgiu County
Romanian female middle-distance runners
Olympic athletes of Romania
Athletes (track and field) at the 1988 Summer Olympics
Olympic gold medalists for Romania
Olympic silver medalists for Romania
Medalists at the 1988 Summer Olympics
Olympic gold medalists in athletics (track and field)
Olympic silver medalists in athletics (track and field)
Universiade medalists in athletics (track and field)
Universiade gold medalists for Romania
Medalists at the 1987 Summer Universiade
Medalists at the 1989 Summer Universiade